"" (also spelt "") is the national anthem of Palau. Officially adopted in 1981, the music was composed by Ymesei O. Ezekiel, to which the combined words of several authors were set.

History 
The anthem was composed by Ymesei Ezekiel (9 January 1921 – 20 May 1984), a composer, musician and music teacher, during the time of the transition from the Trust Territory of the Pacific Islands, which at the time was using the anthem of Micronesia, to the establishment of the Republic of Palau under the trust territory. A committee headed by member of the House of Delegates Demei Otobed was established to adopt a national anthem in line with the new constitution. Along with Otobed and Ezekiel, other members of the committee included historians and musicians Riosang Salvador, Kebekol Alfonso and Hermana Umetaro. The committee members collectively wrote the lyrics of the anthem. The anthem was officially adopted on 1 January 1981, when the Palauan constitution entered into force.

Lyrics

Notes

References

External links
 Streaming audio, lyrics and information for the Palau national anthem (archive link)
 nationalanthems.info Palau page

Oceanian anthems
National symbols of Palau
1980 songs
National anthems
National anthem compositions in E-flat major